Ali Mohamed Yar 
 Ali Yar, Saudi arabia
 Ali Yar, Madina 
Born in (1997/12/27)
He is a young man With amazing mental capabilities and wonderful Possibilities he distinguished between his generation and is expected to a bright future .

See also
 Aliar (disambiguation)
 Yar Ali (disambiguation)